Monodia is a genus of Australian plants in the grass family. The only known species is Monodia stipoides, native to the Kimberley region of Western Australia.

References

Chloridoideae
Flora of Western Australia
Plants described in 1985